Grand Canal Dock railway station serves the Grand Canal Dock area in Dublin, Ireland.

Description
Like several stations in central Dublin, it is elevated above street level, with steps leading down to Barrow Street in South Lotts, beside Google's European headquarters.

The ticket office is open between 06:00-00:00, Monday to Sunday.

The station has three platforms. Platform 1 is a former terminal platform, which became the Northbound main line on 18 July 2016.  Platform 2 is the terminal platform for South Western Commuter trains to Newbridge. Platform 3 is the Southbound main line platform. Platforms 1 and 2 are accessed by a footbridge and platform 3 has level access.

History
Grand Canal Dock was built on the site of a former locomotive shed at Canal Street, across from the engineering works of the Dublin & Kingstown Railway, which were in use between 1834 and 1925.

Between November 2014 and July 2016, the station underwent a major refurbishment to prepare it to serve South Western Commuter trains to Newbridge, which commenced operations on 21 November 2016. Irish Rail rebuilt platform 1, resurfaced the other platforms, installed new destination displays, and provided a new evacuation bridge. Platform 1 lacked overhead electric cables and had a permanent sign reading "Do not board any trains at platform 1" that was removed in May 2015. Platform 1 was fitted with overhead cables in November 2015. Irish Rail also added a centre road terminating turn-back facility to accommodate southbound trains. The refurbishment of the station itself was completed in May 2015, although major resignalling and track work took place for one more year.

City Centre Resignalling
The new signalling was commissioned, along with platform 1, on 17 July 2016.

The completion of the Irish Rail City Centre resignalling project has provided for

An increase in the number of Northern and Maynooth line suburban trains stopping at Grand Canal Dock
Trains from Newbridge terminating at Grand Canal Dock

This has been made possible by making available all three platforms at Grand Canal Dock and increasing the ability of the signalling system in the city centre to operate 20 trains per hour in both directions instead of 8.

See also
 List of railway stations in Ireland

References

External links

  Irish Rail Grand Canal Dock Station Website

Iarnród Éireann stations in Dublin (city)
Railway stations opened in 2001
2001 establishments in Ireland
Railway stations in the Republic of Ireland opened in the 21st century